is a Japanese actor and artist from Isa District, Kagoshima. He is known for his role as private detective Mitsuhiko Asami in the Asami Mitsuhiko Series. He attended Musashino Art University but left before graduating and joined the Shiki Theatre Company. In 1990, Enoki landed the lead role in Heaven and Earth in place of Ken Watanabe, who had to pull out due to illness.

He is also known as an ink painter and his museum opened in 2003.(Located in Kokonoe, Ōita.)

Filmography

Film
 Lost Chapter of Snow: Passion (1985)
 Heaven and Earth (1990) as Uesugi Kenshin
 Best Guy (1990) as Tetsuo "Apollo" Kajitani
  (1991) as Asami Mitsuhiko
 Bloom in the Moonlight (1991) as Tōson Shimazaki
 Toki o Kakeru Shōjo (1997)
 Sleeping Bride (2000)
 Merdeka 17805 (2001)
 Koinu Dan no Monogatari (2002) as Yoshitaka Morishita
 Spy Sorge (2003) as Duke Fumimaro Konoye
 The Wind Carpet (2003)
 Spring Snow (2005)
 Genghis Khan: To the Ends of the Earth and Sea (2007)
 Share House (2011)
 Genji Monogatari: Sennen no Nazo (2011)
 Teiichi: Battle of Supreme High (2017) as The prime minister
 Nobutora (2021) as Uesugi Kenshin
 Signature (2022) as Usuke Asai
 Shimamori no Tō (2022)
 Oshorin (TBA)

Television
 Sanada Taiheiki (1985) as Higuchi Kakubei
 Dokuganryū Masamune (1987) as Ōno Harunaga
 Taiheiki (1991) as Hino Toshimoto
 Wataru Seken wa Oni Bakari as Hisamitsu Aoyama
 Asami Mitsuhiko Series (1995-2006) as Mitsuhiko Asami / Yōichirō Asami
 Kōmyō ga Tsuji (2006) as Azai Nagamasa
 Atsuhime (2008)
 Saka no Ue no Kumo (2009) as Mori Rintaro
 35-sai no Koukousei (2013) as Yoshio Noda
 Yae's Sakura (2013) as Naosuke Ii
 Kirin ga Kuru (2020) as Yamazaki Ieyoshi

Awards

References

External links

Takaaki Enoki Museum (Kyushu Geijutsu no Mori)

1956 births
Living people
Japanese male film actors
Japanese male television actors
Actors from Kagoshima Prefecture
Artists from Kagoshima Prefecture
Asadora lead actors
20th-century Japanese male actors
21st-century Japanese male actors